Zong is the pinyin romanization of the Chinese surname written 宗. The Wade-Giles transliteration is Tsung. 

Zong is also a Cantonese-derived spelling for the surname Zhuang (庄/莊).

According to a 2013 study it was the 217th most common surname, shared by 450,000 people or 0.034% of the population, with Jiangsu being the province with the most people.

People with the surname
 Zong Ai (宗愛) (died 452), Northern Wei eunuch
 Zong Bing (宗炳) (375-444), Chinese artist and musician
 Zong Chen (宗臣) (1525–1560), Ming dynasty scholar-official
 Zong Chuke (宗楚客) (d. 710), Tang dynasty chancellor
 Zong Lei (宗磊) (b. 1981), Chinese footballer
 Zong Pu (宗璞) (b. 1928), Chinese writer and scholar
 Zong Qinghou (宗庆后) (b. 1945), Chinese entrepreneur
 Zong Qinke (宗秦客) (d. 691), Tang dynasty official
 Zong Xiangqing (宗祥慶) (b. 1960), Chinese Olympic fencer
 Zong Yu (宗預) (d. 263), Three Kingdoms general
 Connie Chung (宗毓華 Zōng Yùhuá), American news anchor and journalist 
 Zong Zoua Her, ethnic Hmong leader
 Zong Xiao Chen (宗笑尘) (born 1998), Chinese professional darts player

Chinese-language surnames
Individual Chinese surnames